State highway loops in Texas are owned and maintained by the Texas Department of Transportation (TxDOT).

Loop 300

Loop 300 was a proposed route in Snyder. It was designated on February 23, 1956, from US 180 west of the city, around its west and south sides, to US 84 southeast of it. The route was never built, and the designation was cancelled on October 1, 1968.

Loop 301

Loop 301 is located in Sulphur Springs. It runs from the junction of SH 19 and SH 154 to I-30/US 67.

Loop 301 was designated on February 23, 1956, from US 67 (later Loop 313; now Business US 67) and SH 19 in west Sulphur Springs, northward to SH 154. On September 21, 1965, it was extended southeast to I-30. On April 27, 1967, the section from SH 154 southwest to Loop 313 was transferred to SH 19.

Loop 302

Loop 302 was located in Greenville. It became Business US 67, which is now Spur 302.

Loop 304

Loop 304 is a beltway within Crockett, the county seat of Houston County. It was established in on March 28, 1956. Nearly all of the loop is two lanes wide (one lane in each direction), and provides access for long distance travelers and trucks to bypass the downtown core. Populated areas also dot outside the loop, but have less population density.

Junction list

Loop 305

Loop 305 is located in La Pryor.

Loop 305 was designated on March 28, 1956, as a loop off of US 83 when it was rerouted.

Loop 306

Loop 306 is a state loop that encircles much of San Angelo. Loop 306 begins on the north side of San Angelo, at the US 67/277 interchange, and continues south on the eastern edge of town. The highway multiplexes with US 87 while being routed west. The multiplex ends at the US 87/277/Loop 306 interchange, with Loop 306 routed northwest. Loop 306 ends at the Business US 67 (Sherwood Way) overpass, however the freeway continues and is signed as US 67, Houston Harte Expressway; named after the San Angelo-native publishing magnate. The route is often referred to locally as "the Loop" or "Loop 306", despite the terminus of Loop 306 at Sherwood Way. TxDOT upgraded portions of Loop 306 to expand it from a two-lane road to a four-lane divided highway. From the US 67/277 interchange, Loop 306 continues as a four-lane divided highway all the way to US 87. The upgrades included adding two overpasses and improvements to a divided highway.

Loop 306 was designated on October 24, 1956. On July 30, 1976, the section from US 67 west and southwest to US 67 was transferred to rerouted US 67.

Junction list

Loop 307

Loop 307 was a proposed route in Teague. On October 21, 1959, part of the route was transferred to US 84 when that highway was rerouted. The remainder of Loop 307 was cancelled on April 30, 2004, as its route was already part of FM 553.

Loop 308

Loop 308 is located in Briggs.

Loop 308 was designated on June 22, 1956, as a loop off of US 183 when it was rerouted.

Loop 310

Loop 310 was located in Carrollton. It was designated on February 23, 1956, as a loop off US 77 (now I-35E). Loop 310 was cancelled on November 21, 1991, and returned to the city of Carrollton.

Loop 311

Loop 311 was located in Kilgore.

Loop 311 was designated on August 1, 1956, from SH 259 in downtown Kilgore west 2.4 miles to SH 135 near the west edge of Kilgore. The route was signed as Business SH 135 rather than Loop 311. On June 14, 1968, Loop 311 was cancelled and removed from the highway system.

Loop 313

Loop 313 was located in Sulphur Springs. It ran along a former alignment of US 67. It is now Business US 67.

Loop 315

Loop 315 was located in Greenville.

Loop 315 was designated on November 21, 1956, from US 69 near Peniel south to US 67 southwest of Greenville. On November 30, 1961, the road was extended east over old US 67 to I-30, and southeast to US 69 on October 13, 1971. On May 21, 1979, Loop 315 was routed over US 69 while the old route of Loop 315 was transferred to US 69. Loop 315 was cancelled on June 21, 1990, and transferred to Business US 69-D.

Loop 316

Loop 316 was located in Loraine. It is now Business I-20.

Loop 318

Loop 318 (1957)

The first use of Loop 318 was in Callahan County, from US 380 west and north to FM 576, then east along FM 576 to US 380. Loop 318 was cancelled three months later and transferred to FM 880 and FM 880 Spur.

Loop 318 (1960)

The second use of the Loop 318 designation was in Washington County, as a loop off US 290 in Brenham. This was the former routing of US 290 before it was rerouted on top of a section of Loop 283. On February 28, 1973, the section from US 290 west of Brenham to Market Street was transferred to SH 105. The remainder of Loop 318 was cancelled on June 21, 1990, and transferred to Business US 290-F.

Loop 319

Loop 319 was located in Trent. It is now Business I-20.

Loop 320

Loop 320 was located in Tye. It is now Business I-20.

Loop 321

Loop 321 is located in Wilson County. It is the former route of US 87 through La Vernia.

Loop 322

Loop 323

Loop 328

Loop 328 is located in Carey.

Loop 328 was designated on October 30, 1957, as a loop off of US 287 when it was rerouted.

Loop 329

Loop 329 was located in Columbus.

Loop 329 was designated on February 16, 1982, from SH 71, 4 miles northwest of Columbus, southeast and south 5.1 miles along Fannin Street to I-10. This was formerly a portion of SH 71 before it was rerouted. On June 21, 1990, Loop 329 was cancelled and transferred to Business SH 71-F.

Loop 332

Loop 332 was located in Liberty Hill. Its western terminus was at SH 29. The route headed southeast on a two-lane undivided road that became Main Street. It crossed RM 1869 before turning east at CR 279. Loop 332 crossed a railroad line that is owned by the Capital Metropolitan Transportation Authority and used by the Austin Western Railroad. Loop 332's eastern terminus was at another intersection with SH 29.

Loop 332 was designated on January 22, 1958, as a loop off SH 29 in Liberty Hill. On January 31, 2019, Loop 332 was cancelled and returned to the city of Liberty Hill by request of the city council.

Loop 333

Loop 333 was located in Westbrook. It is now Business I-20.

Loop 334

Loop 334 (1958)

The first use of the Loop 334 designation was in Bexar County, from FM 1604 and I-10 west and south to US 90. On February 27, 1958, the road was extended southwest 3.5 miles to FM 2173 near Macdona. Loop 334 was cancelled on August 7, 1959, and transferred to FM 1604 (now Loop 1604).

Loop 334 (1981)

The next use of the Loop 334 designation was in Panola County as a loop off US 79 in Carthage. The same day a break in the route was added at Loop 455 (now Business US 59). The route was signed as US 79 Business rather than Loop 334. Loop 334 was cancelled on June 21, 1990, and transferred to Business US 79-G.

Loop 335

Loop 335 encircles Amarillo.

Loop 335 was designated on January 18, 1960, from US 60/US 87 south of Amarillo east and north to US 287 east of Amarillo. On January 31, 1961, the road was extended north and west to US 87/US 287 (now Loop 434) and west and north to US 66 (now I-40) on July 30, 1965. On June 21, 1977, the road was extended to new US 87/US 287, replacing a section of FM 1719. On July 24, 1984, the road was extended 10 miles north, northeast and east to US 287, replacing a second section of FM 1719 and completing the loop around Amarillo. On April 21, 2018, the road was rerouted along FM 2186 with the old route transferred to FM 2590, although this will not be effective until construction is complete on this section.

Loop 336

Loop 336, also known as the Veterans Memorial Highway, encircles the city of Conroe. Through trucks traveling east and west are directed onto this loop, as they are prohibited on SH 105 inside Conroe.

Loop 336 was designated on September 27, 1960, as a loop off SH 105 in Conroe. On November 20, 1984, the road was extended around the eastern and southern sides of Conroe to FM 2854 west of Conroe. On February 23, 1989, the road was extended north 1.1 miles from FM 2854 to SH 105, replacing FM 3374 and completing the loop around Conroe.

Junction list

Loop 337

Loop 337 is located in New Braunfels.

Loop 337 was designated on June 1, 1960, from I-35 southwest of New Braunfels north, east and south to FM 25 (now SH 46) at then-US 81 (now Business I-35) east of the Guadalupe River. On February 26, 1972, the road was extended to I-35, replacing a section of FM 25. On May 14, 1990, the route description was modified to show that SH 46 was rerouted concurrent with Loop 337.

Loop 338

Texas State Highway Loop 338 (Loop 338) encircles Odessa. Unlike Loop 250 in neighboring Midland, Loop 338 is not a freeway at any point. Instead, it runs as a divided expressway, divided highway and undivided road.

Loop 338 was designated on September 26, 1960, from US 80, 2.5 miles west of Odessa, north, east, and south around Odessa to then-proposed I-20. On June 30, 1961, the section from US 80 to I-20 was transferred to FM 1357, while Loop 338 was rerouted over a section of FM 1357 from US 80 to a point 2.7 miles north. On April 3, 1964, the road was extended to I-20 east of Odessa, replacing FM 1357. On September 30, 1964, the road was extended south 0.6 mile to I-20. On September 26, 1967, the section from I-20 to SH 302 was transferred to SH 302. On September 27, 1985, the road was extended southeast to US 385, creating a concurrency with SH 302. On February 25, 1992, the road was extended west and north to I-20, completing its current route.

Junction list

Loop 340

Texas State Highway Loop 340 encircles Waco.

Loop 340 was designated on September 27, 1960, running from US 84 southeast and east to US 77 south of Waco. On February 26, 1964, the road was extended northwest 5 miles to US 84 east of Bellmead, replacing Loop 232. On February 29, 1968, the road was extended northwest 1.7 miles to FM 3051, west of US 81. On September 25, 1984, SH 6 was rerouted concurrent with Loop 340; the old route of SH 6 became Loop 484.

Junction list

Loop 343

Loop 343 is located in Austin.

Loop 343 was designated on May 30, 1961, from SH 71 east of Austin near Bergstrom Air Force Base, north along US 183, then west and south to US 290 near western Austin. Portions of the route were formerly SH 71 and US 290 before they were rerouted onto Loop 293. On February 25, 1977, Loop 343 was rerouted along 1st Street (now Cesar Chavez Street) with the former route removed altogether. On November 10, 1986, the section from SH 71 north and east to I-35 was removed from the highway system and returned to the city of Austin.

Loop 344

Loop 344 is located in Azle.

Loop 344 was designated on November 22, 1960, as a loop off SH 199 in Azle as a replacement of SH 199 when it was rerouted.

Loop 345

Loop 345 was located in San Antonio.

Loop 345 was designated on January 26, 1962, as a loop off I-10 in San Antonio as a replacement of US 87 when it was rerouted. The route was signed as US 87 Business until 1992. On December 18, 2014, the section from Balcones Heights south to I-10 was removed and returned to the city of San Antonio and the remainder was redesignated as Spur 345.

Loop 346

Loop 346 was located in Kemp.

Loop 346 was designated on June 25, 1984, as a loop off US 175 in Kemp as a replacement of US 175 when it was rerouted. On June 21, 1990, Loop 346 was cancelled and transferred to Business US 175-D.

Loop 350

State Highway Loop 350 (Loop 350) is a loop in Sealy. It runs from SH 36 via Sealy to SH 36.

Loop 352

Loop 352 was located in Chico.

Loop 352 was designated on August 29, 1961, as a loop off SH 114 (now SH 101) in Chico as a replacement of SH 114 when it was rerouted. On June 21, 1990, Loop 352 was cancelled and transferred to Business SH 101-B.

Loop 353

Loop 354

Loop 354 was located in Dallas. 
Loop 354 was designated on September 19, 1961, from IH-35E in the north part of Dallas, southward along the old route of US 77 to IH-35E in the south part of Dallas. On June 25, 1991, the section from Loop 12 in north Dallas to I-35E in the south part of Dallas was cancelled and given to the city of Dallas. The remainder was cancelled on March 29, 2018, and was given to the city of Dallas.

Loop 355

Loop 355 was located in Abilene. It is now Business I-20.

Loop 357

Loop 357 was located in Decatur. It is now Business US 81.

Loop 358

Loop 358 was located in Orange.

Loop 358 was designated on April 30, 1962, as a loop off I-10 in Orange as a replacement of US 90 when it was rerouted. The route was signed as Business US 90 rather than Loop 358. On June 21, 1990, Loop 358 was cancelled and transferred to Business US 90-Y.

Loop 360

Loop 361

Loop 361 is located in Bedias.

Loop 361 was designated on June 25, 1962, from SH 90/FM 1696 in Bedias west and south to FM 1696.

Loop 362

Loop 362 is located in Amarillo.

Loop 362 was designated on June 26, 1962, along Nelson Street from I-10 to US 287 (now Loop 395). Although Loop 362 was cancelled on June 21, 1990, and transferred to Business US 287-C, it was changed back to Loop 362 four months later.

Loop 363

Loop 365

Loop 365 was located in Lavon.

Loop 365 was designated on April 24, 1967, as a loop off SH 78 in Lavon as a replacement of SH 78 when it was rerouted. The route was signed as SH 78 Business rather than Loop 365. On June 21, 1990, Loop 365 was cancelled and transferred to Business SH 78-G.

Loop 367

Loop 367 (1962)

The first use of the Loop 367 designation was in Scurry County as a loop off US 84 in Hermleigh. The route was signed as US 84 Business rather than Loop 367. On June 21, 1990, Loop 367 was cancelled and transferred to Business US 84-H.

Loop 367 (1996)

The next use of the Loop 367 designation was in Johnson County, from US 67, 3.3 miles west of US 67/SH 174 in Cleburne, north and east 7.9 miles to SH 174, 1 mile north of SH 174/SH 171, north of Cleburne. Loop 367 was cancelled six months later by district request and transferred to US 67 when it was rerouted; the former route of US 67 became Business US 67.

Loop 368

Loop 368 is located in San Antonio.

Loop 368 was designated on August 1, 1962, from I-35 at Fratt southwest along old US 81 to I-35 and Broadway as a replacement of US 81 when it was rerouted east. The route was signed as Business US 81 until 1991 when US 81 was decommissioned in favor of I-35. On December 18, 2014, the section from Alamo Heights to I-410 was planned to be removed from the highway system. This section was to be removed when construction was complete, but in January 2022, TxDOT reversed its decision and retained its jurisdiction as San Antonio did not provide the required acceptance letter for the project.

Loop 369

Loop 369 is located in Abernathy. It is an old alignment of US 87 through the city.

Loop 370

Loop 370 was located in Wichita Falls.

Loop 370 was designated on September 25, 1962, from US 287 near northwestern Iowa Park east via Wichita Falls to SH 79/Loop 165. The route was signed as US 287 Business rather than Loop 370. On February 8, 1972, the western terminus was moved to US 287 in Iowa Park. Loop 370 was cancelled on June 21, 1990, and transferred to Business US 287-J.

Loop 372

Loop 372 was located in Rowlett.

Loop 372 was designated on February 28, 1962, from SH 66 west of Long Branch south and east to Liberty Grove Road, then north to then-proposed SH 66. On December 19, 1991, Loop 372 was cancelled and transferred to Business SH 66-G.

Loop 373

Loop 373 is located in Bridgeport.

Loop 373 was designated on March 29, 2007, from US 380 south, west, and south to SH 114 as a replacement of a section of Business SH 114-H (old Loop 373) and all of Business US 380-E (former Spur 129).

Loop 373 (1962)

The original Loop 373 was designated on November 1, 1962, from FM 920 and new SH 114 east to Spur 129, then south to SH 114. On June 21, 1990, Loop 373 was cancelled and transferred to Business SH 114-H.

Loop 374

Loop 374 was designated on March 20, 1963, from US 83 near western Mission east to US 83 near western Harlingen. The designation became effective when traffic was routed on new US 83. The route was also signed as US 83 Business rather than Loop 374. On March 2, 1967, the road was extended west 5.5 miles to US 83, 0.5 mile west of FM 1427. On September 27, 1987, Loop 374 was rerouted in Mission. On June 21, 1990, Loop 374 was cancelled and transferred to Business US 83-S.

Loop 375

Loop 376

Loop 376 was located in Winnie.

Loop 376 was designated on October 31, 1962, from SH 124/FM 1406 at Winnie, east and northeast 1.3 miles to SH 73. On August 4, 1988, Loop 376 was cancelled by district request and transferred to FM 1406.

Loop 377

Loop 377 was located in Colorado City. It is now Business I-20.

Loop 378

Loop 378 is located in San Angelo.

Loop 378 was designated on December 4, 1968, from US 87 north of San Angelo along Chadbourne St to US 87 at Washington Drive as a replacement of US 87 when it was rerouted. On February 19, 1972, the road was extended south to US 87 when it was rerouted again. On March 29, 1988, the section from US 87 to FM 388 was given to San Angelo and the section from FM 388 to FM 1223 became part of FM 1223.

Loop 382

Loop 382 was located in Grapevine.

Loop 382 was designated on April 18, 1963, as a loop off SH 114 in Grapevine as a replacement of SH 114 when it was rerouted. The route was signed as SH 114 Business rather than Loop 382. On June 21, 1990, Loop 382 was cancelled and transferred to Business SH 114-L.

Loop 384

Loop 384 was located in Round Rock. It was redesignated Business I-35, a segment of which later became the now-cancelled Spur 379.

Loop 385

Loop 385 is located in Bainer.

Loop 385 was designated on May 24, 1963, on the current route as a replacement of US 84 when it was rerouted.

Loop 387

Loop 387 was located in Pilot Point.

Loop 387 was designated on September 26, 1963, as a loop off SH 99 (now US 377) in Pilot Point as a replacement of SH 99 when it was rerouted. On December 19, 1991, Loop 387 was cancelled and transferred to Business US 377-E.

Loop 388

Loop 388 is located in Shallowater.

Loop 388 was designated on September 26, 1963, as a loop off of US 84 in Shallowater as a replacement of US 84 when it was rerouted.

Loop 389

Loop 389 is located in Carbon.

Loop 389 was designated on September 26, 1963, as a loop off SH 6 in Carbon as a replacement of SH 6 when it was rerouted. The route was signed as SH 6 Business rather than Loop 389. On March 2, 1967, a 0.7 mile section from FM 2526 north to SH 6 was cancelled (it was already a portion of FM 2526).

Loop 390

Loop 391

Loop 391 is located in Windom.

Loop 391 was designated on November 20, 1963, as a loop from FM 1743 in Windom east and north via Main Street to US 82.

Loop 392

Loop 392 was located in Alvarado. It is now Business I-35.

Loop 393

Loop 393 is located in Goodrich.

Loop 393 was designated on November 20, 1963, as a loop off of US 59 in Goodrich as a replacement for US 59 when it was rerouted.

Loop 395

Loop 395 is located in Amarillo.

Loop 395 was designated on December 20, 1963, from I-40 and Tee Anchor Boulevard along old US 287 to Pierce Street. On June 21, 1990, Loop 395 was transferred to Business US 287-B, but was transferred back to Loop 395 four months later.

Loop 396

Loop 396 is located in Waco.

Loop 396 was designated on May 27, 1969, as a redesignation of Spur 396 when it was extended to SH 6.

References

+3
State highway loops 300
State highway loops 300